The 2005 Canadian Olympic Curling Trials were held from December 3 to 11 at the Halifax Metro Centre in Halifax, Nova Scotia. The winning teams represented Canada at the 2006 Winter Olympics in Turin, Italy.

Men

Teams

Round-robin standings
Final round-robin standings

Round-robin results

Draw 2

Draw 4

Draw 6

Draw 8

Draw 10

Draw 12

Draw 14

Draw 16

Draw 18

Playoffs

Semifinal

Final

Women

Teams

Round-robin standings
Final round-robin standings

Notes
  Kleibrink claimed the second seed based on round-robin wins over Lawton and Middaugh.

Round-robin results

Draw 1

Draw 3

Draw 5

Draw 7

Draw 9

Draw 11

Draw 13

Draw 15

Draw 17

Tiebreaker

Playoffs

Semifinal

Final

References

External links
 
 
 Video:
 
 

Curling competitions in Halifax, Nova Scotia
Olympic
Canadian Olympic Curling Trials
2005 in Nova Scotia